Deadly Duck is fixed shooter for the Atari 2600 released on January 20, 1982 in North America. It was designed by Ed Hodapp for  Sirius Software and published  by 20th Century Fox Games. It was later ported to the VIC-20.

Gameplay

Cranky crabs are attempting to get the ducks out of their ponds. The crabs fly in the air while throwing bricks and bombs at the ducks. To fight back, the ducks are armed with a bill that is also a gun barrel that shoots a limitless supply of bullets straight up. The player starts with four lives and a bonus life is awarded when all eight crabs in a level have been shot. If the player is hit by a brick they lose a life. When bricks land at the bottom of the play area they impede player movement for a temporary period.

References

1982 video games
Atari 2600 games
VIC-20 games
Fixed shooters
Fox Video Games games
Sirius Software games
Video games about birds
Video games developed in the United States